Morillon may refer to:

People
 Maximilien Morillon (1516–1586), French bishop
 Philippe Morillon (born 1935), French general and politician

Places
 Morillon, Haute-Savoie, Auvergne-Rhône-Alpes, France
 Saint-Morillon, Gironde, Nouvelle-Aquitaine, France

Other
 Morillon, alternative name for 2 varieties of grape:
 Chardonnay
 Négrette